Stuart James Ewin, OAM (born 2 October 1967) is an Australian wheelchair basketball player.  He was born in Melbourne. He was part of the Australia men's national wheelchair basketball team at the 1988 Seoul, 1992 Barcelona, and 1996 Atlanta Paralympics; he won a gold medal as part of the 1996 team, for which he received a Medal of the Order of Australia.

References

Paralympic wheelchair basketball players of Australia
Paralympic gold medalists for Australia
Wheelchair category Paralympic competitors
Wheelchair basketball players at the 1988 Summer Paralympics
Wheelchair basketball players at the 1992 Summer Paralympics
Wheelchair basketball players at the 1996 Summer Paralympics
Medalists at the 1996 Summer Paralympics
Basketball players from Melbourne
Recipients of the Medal of the Order of Australia
1967 births
Living people
Paralympic medalists in wheelchair basketball